George Isidore Sánchez (1906–1972) was a pioneer in American educational scholarship and civil rights activism, originally from the state of New Mexico. He served on the faculty of the University of New Mexico, held several concurrent teaching, chair, and dean positions at The University of Texas at Austin (UT Austin) from 1940 until his death. Sanchez also acted as the 13th president of the League of United Latin American Citizens (LULAC), while spearheading several landmark civil right aimed court cases focusing on equal educational opportunities for Chicano Americans and opposing the use of racially-biased standardized tests based on non-proficiency in English.

Sanchez is remembered as a leading figure in the early "Mexican-American/Chicano" movement, which culminated during World War II, after heavy involvement with and collaboration between Chicano-Americans and Latin Americans through The Office of Inter-American Affairs. In 1998, the UT Austin Education building (SZB) was renamed in his honor.

Biography

Early life
George Isidoro Sánchez was born on October 4, 1906, in Albuquerque, New Mexico. During his early years, his family moved to Arizona, following his father's occupation as both a gold and copper miner. The longest settled period of time George enjoyed as a child happened to be in Jerome, Arizona, now a ghost town, but at the time was known as William A. Clark's copper mining boom town, with shipments moving hourly towards Clark County in Las Vegas, Nevada. His early experiences in a notorious mining company owned town, full of constant human suffering at the hands of a single industrial capitalist may have helped shape his gift for public service in the name of the human race. In 1921, they traveled back to Albuquerque when Sánchez finished ninth grade, so that he was able to finish out his high school career at Albuquerque High School. When he graduated, he worked as a part-time student for seven years at the University of New Mexico, all the while teaching at the surrounding public county school systems.

In 1930, Sánchez graduated cum laude from the University of New Mexico with a Bachelor of Arts in education and Spanish. In 1931, he graduated with a Master of Science in educational psychology and Spanish from The University of Texas at Austin. In 1935, he finally obtained a Doctor of Education in educational administration from the University of California, Berkeley.

Career
Sánchez published his best-known work, Forgotten People: A Study of New Mexicans, in 1940. This book was the first to use sociological methods to document the concerns and experiences of "New Mexicans." Sánchez criticized the inclination to romanticize New Mexico and its people while at the same time ignoring the grinding poverty in the state. He also challenged the U.S. government to address the basic needs of the people, who he said had always been loyal to the nation.

Sánchez gained his greatest accolades after 1940. In that year, he accepted a position as a full professor at the University of Texas at Austin. He was the university's first professor Latin American Studies and later served as the chair of the department of history and philosophy. The year after arriving in Austin, Sánchez was elected national president of LULAC although he only served one term from 1941 to 1942.

Death and legacy
Sánchez died on April 5, 1972. Among many honors in his memory, the National Education Association sponsored the George I. Sánchez Memorial Award to recognize him as the "father of the movement for quality education for Mexican-Americans"; the United States Office of Education named a work section and a room in the new United States Office of Education Building for him; schools in Houston, San Antonio, and Austin, Texas, were named for him; and in 1995 the University of Texas rededicated its Education Building as the George I. Sánchez Building.

Sánchez was a specialist in mental measurements and bilingual education and a critic of culture bias in the intelligence tests of the day. He has been called the founder of Chicano educational psychology, and is still given much credit in regards to his methodical studies on bilingual education, which are still a basis of study in the current field.

See also

 History of the Mexican-Americans in Texas

Footnotes

 Carlos Kevin Blanton, George I. Sánchez: The Long Fight for Mexican American Integration. New Haven, CT: Yale University Press, 2014.

External links
 Sanchez, George Isidore." Handbook of Texas.

1906 births
1972 deaths
Hispanic and Latino American teachers
University of New Mexico faculty
20th-century American educators
League of United Latin American Citizens activists